Karl Hugo Wieslander (11 June 1889 – 24 May 1976) was a Swedish athlete. He set the inaugural world record in the pentathlon in Gothenburg in 1911 with a score of 5516 points. The following year he finished second in the decathlon at the 1912 Summer Olympics in Stockholm, 688 points behind Jim Thorpe. In 1913, after it was discovered that Thorpe had played semi-professional baseball for a minor league team, Thorpe was disqualified for not being an amateur.  Wieslander was declared the winner of the 1912 Olympics event and awarded the gold medal, which he refused to accept. In 1982 Thorpe was reinstated by the IOC with Hugo Wieslander as joint winners of the 1912 Olympic decathlon. The IOC announced 15 July 2022 that Thorpe's gold medal had been reinstated and Wieslander, whose family had considered Thorpe the rightful winner, became the silver medalist.

Wieslander competed in the long jump, discus throw, shot put and two types of javelin throw at the 1908 Olympics. He completed only the freestyle javelin throw event, in which he placed fifth. At the 1912 Olympics, besides his decathlon achievement he finished seventh in the pentathlon. Nationally Wieslander won four Swedish titles: in the high jump (1907), decathlon (1909) and pentathlon (1910 and 1911); in 1906–1908 he placed second-third eight times in various jumping and throwing events. In 1913 he passed the state surveying exam and became employed by the Swedish cartography agency (:sv:Rikets allmänna kartverk).

For many years he was uncomfortable with keeping the 1912 gold medal and contemplated returning it to Thorpe. In 1951, he reconsidered and instead donated it to the sports museum at the Swedish School of Sport and Health Sciences. In 1954, it was stolen from the museum and was never recovered.

References

External links 

 

1889 births
1976 deaths
Swedish decathletes
Athletes (track and field) at the 1908 Summer Olympics
Athletes (track and field) at the 1912 Summer Olympics
Olympic athletes of Sweden
Olympic gold medalists for Sweden
Medalists at the 1912 Summer Olympics
Olympic gold medalists in athletics (track and field)
Olympic decathletes